Boulding is a surname. Notable people with the surname include:

Aaron Boulding (born 1972), American video game journalist
Elise M. Boulding (1920–2010), Norwegian-American Quaker sociologist and wife of Kenneth E. Boulding
Helen Boulding (born 1978), English singer-songwriter and sister of Michael and Rory Boulding
Kenneth E. Boulding (1910–1993), English economist, and systems scientist, and husband of Elise Boulding
Mary Boulding (1929–2009), English nun, translator and writer
Michael Boulding (born 1976), English footballer and brother of Helen and Rory Boulding
Rory Boulding (born 1988), English footballer and brother of Michael and Helen Boulding
William Frederick Boulding (born c. 1955), American professor, dean of the Fuqua School of Business at Duke University

See also
Dorothy Celeste Boulding Ferebee (1898–1980), African-American physician and activist
Kenneth Boulding's Evolutionary Perspective

English-language surnames